Dees may refer to:

Dees (surname), including a list of people with the name
Dees, Illinois, an unincorporated community
Dickinson Dees, British law firm
Larsen v Rick Dees Ltd, 2007 New Zealand Supreme Court case

See also
Dee (disambiguation), singular form
Dee's Drive-In
Sneaky Dee's